Daniel Hayes is an actor, model and boxer. His professional career is based in Toronto, Ontario, Canada.

Early life 
Hayes was born in Trinidad and moved to Canada as a youth. From an early age, Daniel Hayes played soccer, basketball, football, amateur boxing, baseball, and swimming. He attended Thompson Rivers University in Kamloops, British Columbia.
Hayes later studied acting at The Second City and Groundlings, and trained at The Ivana Chubbuck Studio.

Acting career
Hayes began his career as a print model in magazines and billboard ads for Gap, Guess, Nike, Sony, Hugo Boss, Lacoste, Armani Exchange and Andrew Christian. A few years later he was in his first two commercials with And1 and Nike.

In 2016, Hayes worked with filmmaker KB Kutz on The Honey Badger, a 15-minute boxing documentary that closely follows the life of Hayes as he prepares for his professional bout in Mexico. The film was shown at North Hollywood CineFest and Canadian Film Fest.

Filmography

References

External links 

 
 

Living people
Canadian male film actors
Canadian male models
Year of birth missing (living people)